The Beauties of England and Wales (1801–1815) is a series of books describing the topography and local history of England and Wales. Produced by a variety of London publishers, the work appeared in 18 multi-part volumes arranged by county, individually authored by John Bigland, Edward Wedlake Brayley, J. Norris Brewer, John Britton, John Evans, John Hodgson, Francis Charles Laird, Joseph Nightingale, Thomas Rees, and Frederic Shoberl. Each volume contained engraved illustrations by artists such as Thomas Hearne, J. M. W. Turner, John Varley, Benjamin West. Readers included Charles Dickens.

Further reading
 
 
 Contents: Bedfordshire, Berkshire, Buckinghamshire (+ Index)
 
 Contents: Cambridge, Cheshire, Cornwall (+ Index)
  
 Contents: Cumberland, Isle of Man, Derbyshire
  
 Contents: Devonshire, Dorsetshire (+ Index)
 
 Contents: Durham, Essex, Gloucestershire (+ Index)
  
 Contents: Hampshire, Isle of Wight, Herefordshire (+ Index)
  
 Contents: Hertfordshire, Huntingdonshire, Kent (+ Indexes)
  
 Contents: Kent (+ Index)
  
 Contents: Lancashire, Leicestershire, Lincolnshire (+ Index)
   (+ Indexes)
  (+ Index)
  (+ Index)
  (+ Index)
 
 Contents: Monmouthshire, Norfolk
 
 Contents: Northumberland, Nottingham (+ Indexes)
 
 Contents: Oxfordshire, Rutlandshire (+ Indexes)
 
 Contents: Shropshire, Somersetshire  (+ Indexes)
 
 Contents: Staffordshire (+ Indexes)
 
 Contents: Suffolk, Surrey, Sussex (+ Indexes)
 
  + Index

Notes

References

External links
 Hathi Trust. The Beauties of England and Wales; or, Delineations, Topographical, Historical, and Descriptive, of each County, 1801-1815
 Europeana. Beauties of England and Wales

Book series introduced in 1801
19th-century history books
History books about England
History books about Wales
Series of books
Histories of populated places in England
1800s books
1810s books
History of England by county
19th century in England